Josephine Griffin (13 December 1928 – 15 September 2005) was a well-known English film actress who appeared in a string of British films in the 1950s, such as The Purple Plain (1954), The Man Who Never Was (1956) and The Spanish Gardener (1956). After retiring from acting, under her married name Josephine Filmer-Sankey, she wrote about the Bayeux Tapestry and edited the autobiography of Sir John Mandeville.

Biography
Josephine Griffin was born in London on 13 December 1928, the only daughter of Ronald Griffin (son of Sir Lepel Griffin, a British colonial administrator in India).

In 1951–52 she acted in Peter Ustinov's play The Moment of Truth at the Adelphi Theatre in London, with Eric Portman and Cyril Luckham also in the cast.

She then appeared in a number of films in the 1950s. These included: The House of the Arrow (1953), The Weak and the Wicked (1954), The Purple Plain (1954, as Gregory Peck's wife), The Crowded Day (1954), an episode of the television series Fabian of the Yard (1955), Room in the House (1955), The Extra Day (1956) and On Such a Night (short; 1956).

She had perhaps her best roles in two other 1956 films; as Pam in The Man Who Never Was, and as Carol Burton in The Spanish Gardener.

She married in London on 11 October 1956. She made one more film, Portrait of Alison (1958; released in the USA as Postmark for Danger), then retired from the screen.

Husband's family
Her husband Patrick Hugh Filmer-Sankey was a film producer. He was the grandson of Hugh Grosvenor, 2nd Duke of Westminster, and Constance Cornwallis-West (Winston Churchill's step-aunt by marriage).

Josephine Griffin's other connection to Winston Churchill was that he was an unseen character in The Man Who Never Was; his voice was supplied by Peter Sellers.

Literary career
Under her married name Josephine Filmer-Sankey, she co-wrote The Bayeux Tapestry: The Story of the Norman Conquest, 1066, with Norman Denny (published 1966). With Denny, she also edited a new version of The Travels of Sir John Mandeville (1973).

She died in London on 15 September 2005, aged 76, survived by her son William and two grandchildren, Frances and Benedict.

Her name has been attached to a pearl bracelet sold commercially.

Filmography

References

External links
 
 Josephine Griffin Movies at Blockbuster

1928 births
2005 deaths
English film actresses
English art historians
Women art historians
English book editors
Actresses from London
Writers from London
British women historians